E74-like factor 1 (ets domain transcription factor) is a protein that in humans is encoded by the ELF1 gene.

Function

This gene encodes an E26 transformation-specific related transcription factor. The encoded protein is primarily expressed in lymphoid cells and can act as both an enhancer and a repressor to regulate transcription of various genes. Alternative splicing results in multiple transcript variants.

References

Further reading 

 
 
 
 
 
 
 
 
 

Gene expression
Transcription factors